Michael Stuart Brown ForMemRS NAS AAA&S APS (born April 13, 1941) is an American geneticist and Nobel laureate. He was awarded the Nobel Prize in Physiology or Medicine with Joseph L. Goldstein in 1985 for describing the regulation of cholesterol metabolism.

Education and early life 
Brown was born in Brooklyn, New York, the son of Evelyn, a homemaker, and Harvey Brown, a textile salesman. He graduated from Cheltenham High School (Wyncote, Pennsylvania).  Brown graduated from the University of Pennsylvania in 1962 and received his M.D. from the University of Pennsylvania School of Medicine in 1966.

Career and research
Moving to the University of Texas Michael liked vann Warner Health Science Center in Dallas, now the UT Southwestern Medical Center,  Brown and colleague Joseph L. Goldstein researched cholesterol metabolism and discovered that human cells have low-density lipoprotein (LDL) receptors that extract cholesterol from the bloodstream. The lack of sufficient LDL receptors is implicated in familial hypercholesterolemia, which predisposes heavily for cholesterol-related diseases.  In addition to explaining the underlying pathology of this disease, their work uncovered a fundamental aspect of cell biology - receptor-mediated endocytosis.

Their findings led to the development of statin drugs, the cholesterol-lowering compounds that today are used by 16 million Americans and are the most widely prescribed medications in the United States. Their discoveries are improving more lives every year, both in the US and around the world. New federal cholesterol guidelines will triple the number of Americans taking statin drugs to lower their cholesterol, reducing the risk of heart disease and stroke for countless people.  Following these important advances, their team of dedicated researchers elucidated the role of lipid modification of proteins (protein prenylation) in cancer. In 1984 he was awarded the Louisa Gross Horwitz Prize from Columbia University together with Joseph L. Goldstein (co-recipient of 1985 Nobel Prize in Physiology or Medicine). In 1988, Brown received the National Medal of Science for his contributions to medicine.

In 1993, their trainees Xiaodong Wang and Michael Briggs purified the sterol regulatory element binding proteins (SREBPs).  Since 1993, Drs. Brown, Goldstein, and their colleagues have described the unexpectedly complex machinery by which cells maintain the necessary levels of fats and cholesterol in the face of varying environmental circumstances.

Dr. Brown holds the W. A. (Monty) Moncrief Distinguished Chair in Cholesterol and Arteriosclerosis Research; is a Regental Professor of the University of Texas; holds the Paul J. Thomas Chair in Medicine.  Frequently mentioned as a candidate for nationally prominent positions in scientific administration, Dr. Brown, like his colleague Joseph L. Goldstein, elects to continue hands-on involvement with research, leading a research team that typically includes a dozen doctoral and postdoctoral trainees. He and his colleague are among the most highly cited scientists in the world.

Brown is also on the prestigious Prix Galien USA Committee that "recognizes the technical, scientific and clinical research skills necessary to develop innovative medicines". The inauguration of the Prix Galien in the US, the equivalent of the Nobel Prize in this field, was in September 2007, and the winners were selected by a preeminent scientific and learned committee that included seven Nobel laureates, of which Brown was one.

Awards and honors 
Brown has won numerous awards and honors, including:

2016 - Keynote Speaker at the Congress of Future Medical Leaders
 2011 - Stadtman Distinguished Scientist Award, American Society for Biochemistry and Molecular Biology
 2007 - Builders of Science Award, Research!America
 2005 - Woodrow Wilson Award for Public Service
 2005 - Herbert Tabor Award, American Society for Biochemistry and Molecular Biology
 2003 - Albany Medical Center Prize
 2002 - Kober Medal, Association of American Physicians
 1999 - Warren Alpert Foundation Prize, Harvard Medical School
 1991 - Elected a Foreign Member of the Royal Society (ForMemRS)
 1987 - Elected member of the American Philosophical Society
 1986 - Golden Plate Award of the American Academy of Achievement
 1985 - Nobel Prize for physiology and medicine
 1985 - Albert Lasker Award for Basic Medical Research
 1985 - William Allan Award, American Society of Human Genetics
 1984 - Louisa Gross Horwitz Prize
 1981 - Gairdner Foundation International Award
 1981 - Elected member of the American Academy of Arts and Sciences
 1980 - elected member of the National Academy of Sciences
 1979 - Lounsbery Award, U.S. National Academy of Sciences
 1978 - Passano Award, Johns Hopkins University
 1976 - Pfizer Award in Enzyme Chemistry, American Chemical Society
 1974 - Heinrich Wieland Prize

Bibliography

References

External links 
 

1941 births
Living people
Nobel laureates in Physiology or Medicine
American Nobel laureates
Richard-Lounsbery Award laureates
American geneticists
Jewish geneticists
Foreign Members of the Royal Society
Members of the United States National Academy of Sciences
The Daily Pennsylvanian people
Jewish American scientists
National Medal of Science laureates
Perelman School of Medicine at the University of Pennsylvania alumni
Scripps Research
Recipients of the Albert Lasker Award for Basic Medical Research
People from Cheltenham, Pennsylvania
Members of the American Philosophical Society
Members of the National Academy of Medicine
University of Texas Southwestern Medical Center faculty